Rutherford Latham (born 7 October 1954) is a Spanish equestrian. He competed at the 1984 Summer Olympics, the 1996 Summer Olympics and the 2000 Summer Olympics.

References

External links
 

1954 births
Living people
Spanish male equestrians
Olympic equestrians of Spain
Equestrians at the 1984 Summer Olympics
Equestrians at the 1996 Summer Olympics
Equestrians at the 2000 Summer Olympics
Sportspeople from Madrid